Titouan Castryck (born 2004) is a French slalom canoeist who has competed at the international level since 2021.

He won a bronze medal in the K1 team event at the 2022 World Championships in Augsburg.

References

External links

Living people
French male canoeists
Medalists at the ICF Canoe Slalom World Championships
2004 births